Mikhail Aleksandrovich Trofimov (born 5 August 1974) is a Russian professional football coach and a former player.

Club career
He made his debut in the Russian Premier League in 1992 for FC Zenit St. Petersburg.

References

1974 births
Footballers from Baku
Living people
Russian footballers
Russian Premier League players
FC Zenit Saint Petersburg players
FC Salyut Belgorod players
Russian expatriate footballers
Expatriate footballers in Kazakhstan
FC Sibir Novosibirsk players
Russian expatriate sportspeople in Kazakhstan
FC Volga Nizhny Novgorod players
Association football defenders
FC Dynamo Saint Petersburg players
FC Sever Murmansk players